Youth March for Integrated Schools may refer to:
 Youth March for Integrated Schools (1958)
 Youth March for Integrated Schools (1959)